Mattias Siimar (born 3 February 1998) is an Estonian tennis player.

Siimar has a career high ATP singles ranking of 1036, achieved on 25 October 2021.

Playing for Estonia in Davis Cup, Siimar has a win–loss record of 5–6. His twin brother Kristofer Siimar is also a tennis player.

ITF World Tennis Tour and Challenger finals

Singles: 1 (0–1)

Davis Cup

Participations: (5–6)

   indicates the outcome of the Davis Cup match followed by the score, date, place of event, the zonal classification and its phase, and the court surface.

External links
 
 
 

1998 births
Living people
Estonian male tennis players
Sportspeople from Tallinn
21st-century Estonian people